Fernand Schammel (30 March 1923 – 17 May 1961) was a Luxembourgian footballer. He competed in the men's tournament at the 1948 Summer Olympics.

Career statistics

International goals

References

External links
 

1923 births
1961 deaths
Luxembourgian footballers
Luxembourg international footballers
Olympic footballers of Luxembourg
Footballers at the 1948 Summer Olympics
Sportspeople from Luxembourg City
Association football forwards
Union Luxembourg players